Vermont Route 129 (VT 129) is a short,  connector route for Isle La Motte and Alburgh in the state of Vermont in the United States. VT 129 begins at an intersection in the centre of Isle La Motte, heads northward and terminates at an intersection with U.S. Route 2 (US 2) in Alburgh. The route originated as Vermont Route F-2 in 1926, and was the name of the road that approached a ferry to Chazy. Route F-2 followed the same routing as the current VT 129, to which it was renumbered in 1944.

Route description 

VT 129 begins at an intersection with School and Church Streets on Isle La Motte, heading northward as a portion of Main Street. This part of the highway is town maintained. VT 129 then heads north, intersecting with Shrine Road (Town Highway 2) before leaving Isle La Motte over a bridge for Alburgh. The highway turns eastward, intersecting with local roads and passing to the south of Alburg Golf Links. VT 129 then heads to the south, paralleling the shores of the La Motte Passage (a part of Lake Champlain). At a curve to the east, VT 129 intersects with a short extension of a nearby highway, which terminates quickly. The route leaves the connector and heads eastward towards US 2, soon terminating at an intersection with US 2 on the shores of another connector in South Alburgh.

History 
The entire length of Vermont 129 was originally designated as VT F-2 in 1926. VT F-2 originally went from US 2 to a ferry across Lake Champlain to Chazy, New York. Many of the F-x series routes along the shores of Lake Champlain were changed to new designations in the 1940s, 1950s, and 1960s. VT F-2 was redesignated by 1944 as VT 129. Between 1959 and 2008, VT 129 was truncated to School Street on Isle La Motte.

Major intersections

Notes

References

External links

Termini of Vermont Route 129 

129
Transportation in Grand Isle County, Vermont